Gail Fisher (August 18, 1935 – December 2, 2000) was an American actress who was one of the first black women to play substantive roles in American television. She was best known for playing the role of secretary Peggy Fair on the television detective series Mannix from 1968 through 1975, a role for which she won two Golden Globe Awards and an Emmy Award; she was the first African-American woman to win those prestigious awards. She also won an NAACP Image Award in 1969.

Early years
The youngest of five children, Fisher was born in Orange, New Jersey. Her father died when she was two years old, and she was raised by her mother, Ona Fisher, who supported her family with a home-operated hair-styling business while living in the Potter's Crossing neighborhood of Edison, New Jersey. She graduated from Metuchen High School in Metuchen, New Jersey. During her teenage years, she was a cheerleader and entered several beauty contests, winning the titles of Miss Transit, Miss Black New Jersey, and Miss Press Photographer.

In a contest sponsored by Coca-Cola, Fisher won the opportunity to spend two years studying acting at the American Academy of Dramatic Arts. As a student of acting in New York City, she worked with Lee Strasberg and became a member of the Repertory Theater at Lincoln Center, where she worked with Elia Kazan and Herbert Blau. As a young woman, she also worked as a model.

Career
Fisher made her first television appearance in 1960 at age 25, appearing in the NTA Film Network program The Play of the Week. Also during the early 1960s, she appeared in a television commercial for All laundry detergent, which she said made her "the first black female—no, make that black, period—to make a national TV commercial, on camera, with lines." In 1965, Herbert Blau cast her in a theatrical production of Danton's Death.

She first appeared in Mannix during the second season, when Mannix leaves a detective firm and sets up shop as a private investigator. She became the second African American woman after Nichelle Nichols of Star Trek to show prominently on weekly television. In 1968, she made guest appearances on the TV series My Three Sons; Love, American Style; and Room 222. In 1970, her work on Mannix was honored when she received the Emmy Award for Outstanding Supporting Actress in a Drama Series, becoming the first African-American woman to do so. In 1971, Fisher became the first African-American woman to win a Golden Globe, and won her second in 1973. After Mannix was cancelled in 1975, she appeared on television about once a year, guest starring on popular shows such as Fantasy Island, Knight Rider, General Hospital,  and The White Shadow.

Personal life
Fisher was married and divorced twice. She had two daughters, Samara and Jole, from her 1964 marriage to John Levy. Her marriage to Wali Muhammad (Walter Youngblood), famed cornerman to Sugar Ray Robinson and Muhammad Ali, ended in divorce when he changed religions. Wali was also an assistant minister to Malcolm X at Nation of Islam Mosque No. 7.

Jet magazine reported in its July 26, 1973 issue that she also was married to Robert A. Walker, a businessman from Los Angeles. In 1978, she was arrested for cocaine and marijuana possession and for illegally operating a blue box.

Death
Fisher died in Los Angeles in 2000, aged 65, reportedly from kidney failure. Twelve hours later, her brother Clifton died from heart failure.

Filmography

Film

Television

Awards and honors

References

Notes

Citations

Sources

External links
 
 

1935 births
2000 deaths
Actresses from New Jersey
African-American actresses
American television actresses
American film actresses
Best Supporting Actress Golden Globe (television) winners
Best Drama Actress Golden Globe (television) winners
Outstanding Performance by a Supporting Actress in a Drama Series Primetime Emmy Award winners
Deaths from kidney failure
People from Orange, New Jersey
People from Edison, New Jersey
African-American female models
Female models from New Jersey
African-American models
American stage actresses
20th-century American actresses
Metuchen High School alumni
People from Metuchen, New Jersey
20th-century African-American women
20th-century African-American people